Chariergodes is a genus of beetles in the family Cerambycidae, containing the following species:

 Chariergodes anceps (Melzer, 1927)
 Chariergodes carinicollis (Zajciw, 1963)
 Chariergodes flava (Zajciw, 1963)
 Chariergodes turrialbae (Giesbert, 1991)

References

Rhinotragini